The I-670 Viaduct is an automobile crossing of the Kansas River, and West Bottoms in Kansas City, Kansas, and Kansas City, Missouri.
It was built in 1990, and carries six lanes (three east, three west) of Interstate 670 through Kansas City. The bridge is also called the Jay B. Dillingham bridge. (Dillingham was the president of the Kansas City Stockyards)
It is just north of the Missouri Pacific Bridge, and south of the Central Avenue Bridge (Kansas City) over the Kansas River.

Bridges over the Kansas River
Bridges in Kansas City, Kansas
Bridges in Kansas City, Missouri
Road bridges in Missouri
Road bridges in Kansas
Interstate 70
Girder bridges in the United States
Bridges on the Interstate Highway System
Bridges completed in 1990
1990 establishments in Kansas
1990 establishments in Missouri